Sir James Crawford Maxwell,  (1869 – 1932) was a British physician and colonial administrator.

Biography
Maxwell was born in Dundee, Scotland in 1869. He was educated at the High School of Dundee, before studying medicine at the University of Edinburgh, graduating M.B., C.M. in 1893, and proceeding M.D. in 1896. He was House-Surgeon at Halifax Infirmary for a brief period before becoming a district medical officer in Sierra Leone between 1897-1900. He was awarded the West Africa Medal and a clasp for his role in the Hut Tax War of 1898.

In 1900, he moved into political service and served first as a district commissioner in Sierra Leone. He was awarded the CMG in 1911. Between 1914-1920 he served as First Class Resident in Nigeria. He thereafter returned to Sierra Leone as Colonial Secretary, before being promoted to a similar role in the Gold Coast.

In 1927 he was appointed Governor and Commander in Chief of Northern Rhodesia.

He retired in 1932 and died later that year aged 63 whilst on voyage to Australia.

References 

1869 births
1932 deaths
People from Dundee
People educated at the High School of Dundee
Alumni of the University of Edinburgh
British expatriates in Nigeria
British expatriates in Sierra Leone
British expatriates in Ghana
Colonial Secretaries of Sierra Leone
Chief Secretaries of the Gold Coast (British colony)
Governors of Northern Rhodesia
Knights Commander of the Order of St Michael and St George
Knights Commander of the Order of the British Empire